Peter Cleall (born 16 March 1944 in Finchley, Middlesex) is an actors' agent and former actor who is probably best known for playing wise-cracking Eric Duffy in the London Weekend Television comedy series  Please Sir! which ran from 1968 to 1972, and its sequel The Fenn Street Gang from 1971 to 1973. He also advertised Tunes menthol sweets, as a passenger buying a train ticket to Nottingham, in 1985.

Early life
Cleall's father was a draughtsman. He was educated at Brighton College and trained as an actor at East 15 Acting School.

Career
He began his acting career at Watford Palace Theatre and appeared at many theatres throughout the country including a number of seasons at Regent's Park Open Air Theatre.  His first screen appearance was in the horror feature Theatre of Death (1967) which starred Christopher Lee, and his other film roles included Confessions of a Pop Performer (1975), Under the Doctor (1976), Adventures of a Plumber's Mate (1978), and the film version of Please Sir! in 1971.

Cleall played at the Edinburgh Festival and on tour in a one-person show titled The World Turned Upside Down which told of the experiences of an ordinary man caught up in the aftermath of the English Civil War.

He played Detective Sergeant Harrison in the BBC Radio 7 / Radio 4 Extra audio series "Detective", written by Raymond Barr.

Personal life
Cleall is married to Dione Inman with whom he has two sons, Daniel and Spencer.  Previously, he was married to Catherine McNamara by whom he also had two sons: Miles and Damian.

Cleall has worked as an agent for over 20 years helping to run Pelham Associates, which is based in Brighton, East Sussex.

Television appearances
Please Sir
D.H. Lawrence Playhouse
Thirty-Minute Theatre
Mickey Dunne
Dixon of Dock Green
The Paul Hogan Show
Spooner's Patch
Dempsey and Makepeace
Minder
Are You Being Served?
Unipart TV advert' : " Thousands of Parts for Millions of Cars " . ( Co-stars Michael Ripper )Grange HillPeak PracticeA Tale of Two CitiesThe BillCasualtyGrowing PainsThief TakersBig DealTill Death Us Do PartEastendersSpecial Branch''

References

External links

 Pelham Associates

People from Finchley
Male actors from London
English male television actors
English male stage actors
1944 births
Living people
People educated at Brighton College
Alumni of East 15 Acting School